The following is an alphabetical list of articles related to the U.S. State of Nebraska.

0–9 

.ne.us – Internet second-level domain for the state of Nebraska
37th state to join the United States of America

A
Adjacent states:
State of Colorado
State of Iowa
State of Kansas
State of Missouri
State of South Dakota
State of Wyoming
Agriculture in Nebraska
airports (category)
American West
"Old West" or "Wild West"
Amusement parks in Nebraska
Arbor Day
Arboreta in Nebraska
commons:Category:Arboreta in Nebraska
Archaeology of Nebraska
:Category:Archaeological sites in Nebraska
commons:Category:Archaeological sites in Nebraska
Architecture of Nebraska
Art museums and galleries in Nebraska
commons:Category:Art museums and galleries in Nebraska
Astronomical observatories in Nebraska
commons:Category:Astronomical observatories in Nebraska

B
Berkshire Hathaway
Botanical gardens in Nebraska
commons:Category:Botanical gardens in Nebraska
Boy Scouts of America
Scouting in Nebraska
Buildings and structures in Nebraska
commons:Category:Buildings and structures in Nebraska

C

California Trail
Capital of the state of Nebraska
Capital punishment
Executions by the state
Capitol of the State of Nebraska
commons:Category:Nebraska State Capitol
Census Designated Places in Nebraska
Census statistical areas in Nebraska
cities
state capital
Climate of Nebraska
Climate change in Nebraska 
colleges
community colleges
Communications in Nebraska
commons:Category:Communications in Nebraska
companies (category)
congressional districts
U.S. House of Representatives (District 1, 2, 3, 4, 5, 6)
legislators
state (category)
federal
Convention centers in Nebraska
commons:Category:Convention centers in Nebraska

cottonwood
Counties of the state of Nebraska
commons:Category:Counties in Nebraska
name etymologies
Culture of Nebraska
:Category:Nebraska culture
commons:Category:Nebraska culture
breweries (category)
Omaha (category)
museums (category)
musical groups (category)
religion (category)
churches (category)
theaters (category)
writers (category)

D
Demographics of Nebraska
Dust Bowl
Nebraska Department of Roads

E
East Omaha
Economy of Nebraska
:Category:Economy of Nebraska
commons:Category:Economy of Nebraska
Education in Nebraska
:Category:Education in Nebraska
commons:Category:Education in Nebraska
colleges and universities
high schools
school districts
Elections in the state of Nebraska
commons:Category:Nebraska elections
Environment of Nebraska
commons:Category:Environment of Nebraska
etymologies
county names
executions

F

Farming
Festivals in Nebraska
commons:Category:Festivals in Nebraska
Flag of the state of Nebraska
Ford, Gerald Rudolph, Jr.
Forts in Nebraska
:Category:Forts in Nebraska
commons:Category:Forts in Nebraska

G

Geography of Nebraska
:Category:Geography of Nebraska
commons:Category:Geography of Nebraska
Geology of Nebraska
commons:Category:Geology of Nebraska
Ghost towns in Nebraska
:Category:Ghost towns in Nebraska
commons:Category:Ghost towns in Nebraska
Goldenrod
Government of the state of Nebraska  website
:Category:Government of Nebraska
commons:Category:Government of Nebraska
government agencies
Nebraska Game and Parks Commission
Governor of the state of Nebraska
List of governors of the territory of Nebraska
List of governors of the state of Nebraska
Great Plains
Great Seal of the State of Nebraska

H
Heritage railroads in Nebraska
commons:Category:Heritage railroads in Nebraska
Highway routes in Nebraska
Lincoln Highway
list
interstate (category)
Nebraska Department of Roads (category)
state (category)
U.S. (category)
Hiking trails in Nebraska
commons:Category:Hiking trails in Nebraska
History of Nebraska
Historical figures
Historical outline of Nebraska
Homestead Act
hospitals
Houses (category)

I
Images of Nebraska
commons:Category:Nebraska
Interstate Highways (category)
commons:Category:Nebraska Department of Roads

J
Job's Daughters was founded in Omaha in 1920 by Ethel T. Wead Mick.

K
Kansas–Nebraska Act

L
Lakes of Nebraska
commons:Category:Lakes of Nebraska
Lancaster, Nebraska Territory
Landmarks in Nebraska
commons:Category:Landmarks in Nebraska
law
executions by the state
Lincoln, Nebraska, territorial and state capital since 1867
Buildings and structures (category)
Lincoln Highway
Lists related to the state of Nebraska:
List of airports in Nebraska
List of census statistical areas in Nebraska
List of cities in Nebraska
List of colleges and universities in Nebraska
List of counties in Nebraska
List of dams and reservoirs in Nebraska
List of forts in Nebraska
List of ghost towns in Nebraska
List of governors of Nebraska
List of high schools in Nebraska
List of highway routes in Nebraska
List of hospitals in Nebraska
List of individuals executed in Nebraska
List of lakes in Nebraska
List of law enforcement agencies in Nebraska
List of museums in Nebraska
List of National Historic Landmarks in Nebraska
List of newspapers in Nebraska
List of people from Nebraska
List of power stations in Nebraska
List of radio stations in Nebraska
List of railroads in Nebraska
List of Registered Historic Places in Nebraska
List of rivers of Nebraska
List of school districts in Nebraska
List of state parks in Nebraska
List of state prisons in Nebraska
List of symbols of the state of Nebraska
List of television stations in Nebraska
List of United States congressional delegations from Nebraska
List of United States congressional districts in Nebraska
List of United States representatives from Nebraska
List of United States senators from Nebraska
List of villages in Nebraska
Louisiana Purchase

M
Maps of Nebraska
commons:Category:Maps of Nebraska
meadowlark
metropolitan areas
Omaha
Lincoln
Sioux City
Midwestern United States
Missouri River
Mormon Trail
Mountains of Nebraska
commons:Category:Mountains of Nebraska
Museums in Nebraska
:Category:Museums in Nebraska
commons:Category:Museums in Nebraska
Music of Nebraska
commons:Category:Music of Nebraska
:Category:Musical groups from Nebraska
:Category:Musicians from Nebraska

N
National Forests of Nebraska
commons:Category:National Forests of Nebraska
National Recreation Trails in Nebraska
National Wildlife Refuges (category)
Natural history of Nebraska
commons:Category:Natural history of Nebraska
Nature centers in Nebraska
commons:Category:Nature centers in Nebraska
navy ships named USS Nebraska
NE – United States Postal Service postal code for the state of Nebraska
Nebraska  website
:Category:Nebraska
commons:Category:Nebraska
commons:Category:Maps of Nebraska
Nebraska Extreme
Nebraska Library Commission
Nebraska Religious Coalition for Science Education
Nebraska State Capitol
Nebraska State Historical Society
Nebraska State Patrol
newspapers (category)
North Omaha
North Platte River

O
Old West
Omaha, Nebraska, territorial capital 1854-1867
See here for a complete listing of categories.
Oregon Trail
Outdoor sculptures in Nebraska
commons:Category:Outdoor sculptures in Nebraska
Olson Nature Preserve

P
Prairie
Nebraska Panhandle
Panorama Point
parks, state
People from Nebraska
:Category:People from Nebraska
commons:Category:People from Nebraska
:Category:People by city in Nebraska
:Category:People by county in Nebraska
:Category:People from Nebraska by occupation
Pine Ridge
Platte River
politicians (category)
Politics of Nebraska
commons:Category:Politics of Nebraska
prisons, state
Protected areas of Nebraska
commons:Category:Protected areas of Nebraska

Q

R
radio stations
railroads
Union Pacific
Rainwater Basin
Registered Historic Places
Religion in Nebraska
:Category:Religion in Nebraska
commons:Category:Religion in Nebraska
Rivers of Nebraska
Missouri River
Platte River
:Category:Rivers of Nebraska
commons:Category:Rivers of Nebraska
Roads
Rock formations in Nebraska
commons:Category:Rock formations in Nebraska

S
Spade Ranch
Sandhills
school districts
high schools
Scouting in Nebraska
seal
senators
Settlements in Nebraska
Cities in Nebraska
Villages in Nebraska
Townships in Nebraska
Census Designated Places in Nebraska
Other unincorporated communities in Nebraska
List of ghost towns in Nebraska
slavery
state (category)
United States
ships of the U.S. Navy, USS Nebraska
Smith Falls
Sports in Nebraska
:Category:Sports in Nebraska
commons:Category:Sports in Nebraska
:Category:Sports venues in Nebraska
commons:Category:Sports venues in Nebraska
State of Nebraska  website
Government of the state of Nebraska
:Category:Government of Nebraska
commons:Category:Government of Nebraska
state highways (category)
State Patrol of Nebraska
state prisons
state universities
Structures in Nebraska
commons:Category:Buildings and structures in Nebraska
Symbols of the state of Nebraska
:Category:Symbols of Nebraska
commons:Category:Symbols of Nebraska

T
Telecommunications in Nebraska
commons:Category:Communications in Nebraska
Telephone area codes in Nebraska
television stations
Territory of Dakota, (1861–1882)-1889
Territory of Louisiana, 1805–1812
Territory of Missouri, 1812–1821
Territory of Nebraska, 1854–1867
Tourism in Nebraska  website
commons:Category:Tourism in Nebraska
Transportation in Nebraska
:Category:Transportation in Nebraska
commons:Category:Transport in Nebraska

U
Unincorporated communities in Nebraska
United States of America
States of the United States of America
United States census statistical areas of Nebraska
United States congressional delegations from Nebraska
United States congressional districts in Nebraska
United States Court of Appeals for the Eighth Circuit
United States District Court for the District of Nebraska
United States Representatives from Nebraska
United States Senators from Nebraska
Universities and colleges in Nebraska
U.S. highway routes in Nebraska
US-NE – ISO 3166-2:US region code for the state of Nebraska
USS Nebraska

V
Villages in Nebraska

W
Waterfalls of Nebraska
commons:Category:Waterfalls of Nebraska
Wikimedia
Wikimedia Commons:Category:Nebraska
commons:Category:Maps of Nebraska
Wikinews:Category:Nebraska
Wikinews:Portal:Nebraska
Wikipedia Category:Nebraska
Wikipedia:WikiProject Nebraska
:Category:WikiProject Nebraska articles
:Category:WikiProject Nebraska participants
wildlife
cougar
coyote
hunting
meadowlark
National Wildlife Refuges (category)
pronghorn
white-tailed deer
Wild West
Wildcat Hills

X

Y

Z
Zoos in Nebraska
commons:Category:Zoos in Nebraska

See also

Topic overview:
Nebraska
Outline of Nebraska

National Register of Historic Places listings in Nebraska

Nebraska
 
Nebraska